Saba Abkar is an area, north of Baghdad, Iraq, located on the eastern bank of Tigris, just outside of Adhamiya.

References

Neighborhoods in Baghdad